Aval (English :She)  is a 2011-2013 Indian Tamil-language family soap opera that aired Monday through Friday on Vijay TV from 7 November 2011 to 4 May 2012 at 7:00PM IST and 7 May 2012 to 15 March 2013 at 6:30PM IST for 416 episodes. The concept development and direction is by G. Jayakumar, with U. Vallimuthu being the episode director. It is a remake of the Malayalam serial Kumkumapoovu that was aired on Asianet.

Plot
The series focuses on the relationship between a mother and her daughter. Jayanthi (Lakshmy Ramakrishnan) arranges for her daughter Amala (Mahalakshmi) to be married to Mahesh (Sanjeev). All's well with them until Amala finds out about Shalini (Sreekala/Nithya Ram), who lives in Mahesh's house. Jayanthi must come to terms with her feelings about the daughter she believed dead.

Cast
 Lakshmy Ramakrishnan as Jayanthi (Shalini & Amala Mother)
 Sanjeev as Mahesh (Amala Husband)
 Mahalakshmi as Amala (Mahesh Wife)
 Sreekala/Nithya Ram as Shalini 
Harish Siva as Sheela Husband.
 Manikandan as Meyyappan
 Balaji
 Sridhar as Arun (Jayanthi's son)
Kanya Bharathi

Airing history 
The series started airing on Vijay TV on 7 November 2011  Monday through Friday at 7:00PM IST. From Monday 7 May 2012, the series was moved  to the 6:30PM IST time slot to make way for a new series, 7C.

Adaptations

References

External links
 Official website

Star Vijay original programming
Tamil-language romance television series
2011 Tamil-language television series debuts
Tamil-language television series based on Malayalam-language television series
Tamil-language television shows
2013 Tamil-language television series endings